The 2013 Mubadala World Tennis Championship was a non-ATP affiliated exhibition tournament. It was the 6th edition of the Mubadala World Tennis Championship with the world's top players competing in the event, which was held in a knockout format. The winner received a purse of $250,000. The event was held at the Abu Dhabi International Tennis Complex at the Zayed Sports City in Abu Dhabi, United Arab Emirates. It was a warm-up event for the 2014 tennis season, with the ATP World Tour beginning on December 30, 2013.

Players

Players List confirmed on 8 October

Champion

 Novak Djokovic def.  David Ferrer, 7–5, 6–2
Djokovic wins his third title in Abu Dhabi.

References

External links
Official website

World Tennis Championship
2013 in Emirati tennis
World Tennis Championship